Musicians Seamounts are a chain of seamounts in the Pacific Ocean, north of the Hawaiian Ridge. There are about 65 seamounts, some of which are named after musicians. These seamounts exist in two chains, one of which has been attributed to a probably now-extinct hotspot called the Euterpe hotspot. Others may have formed in response to plate tectonics associated with the boundary between the Pacific Plate and the former Farallon Plate.

The seamounts were constructed on young oceanic crust during the Cretaceous, but a second phase of volcanic activity took place during the Eocene. Deep sea coral reefs occur on the seamounts.

Geography and geomorphology 

The seamounts were formerly known as the North Hawaiian Seamount Range and were among the first submarine mountains to be thoroughly researched.

The seamounts consist of two separate chains (one trending in north-south direction parallel to the Emperor Seamounts and the other in northwest-southeast direction parallel to the northern Line Islands) of ridges that extend east-west and seamounts. The Musicians horst and the Southern Ridges are additional features of the Musicians Seamounts. Larger than the seamounts are volcanic lineaments, on which the seamounts formed. Terrain observed by remotely operated vehicles shows large blocks, pillow lavas, flat terrain, lava flows and talus.

The total number of seamounts is about 65, some of which Henry William Menard named after 18th century musicians. Among the seamounts known by name are:

 The "Northwest Cluster"
 Rossini
 Bizet
 Godard
 Wagner 
 Shostakovich
 Strauss 
 Bellini
 Verdi
 Puccini
 Schubert
 Donizetti
 Hammerstein
 Mahler
 Brahms
 Mussorgski
 Debussy
 Dvorak 
 Rachmaninoff
 Tchaikovsky
 Liszt
 Paganini
 Mozart 
 Khachaturian
 Grieg 
 Gounod
 Handel
 Scarlatti
 Ravel
 Gluck
 Sibelius
 Chopin
 Haydn
 Bach Ridge
 West Schumann
 West Mendelssohn 
 East Mendelssohn
 Prokofiev 
 Paumakua.

Geology 

The Pacific Ocean floor beneath the seamounts is of Cretaceous age and is subdivided by the Murray Fracture Zone into an older northern (100 to 95 million years ago) and a younger southern (80 to 85 million years ago) sector. To the north, the Musicians Seamounts are limited by the Pioneer Fracture Zone. The Musicians Seamounts developed on crust that was no more than 20 million years old, and paleomagnetic information indicates that the seamounts were located between 0 and 10° north of the equator when they developed. Only several of the seamounts reached above sea level.

Rock samples dredged from the seamounts include basalt, hawaiite, mugearite and trachyte. Minerals contained in the rocks consist of aegirine, augite, clinopyroxene, feldspar, oxidized olivine, orthopyroxene, plagioclase and pyroxene. Calcite, clay and zeolites have formed through alteration processes, and manganese nodules have been encountered as well. The petrogenesis of Musicians Seamounts magmas has been explained by the mixing of several mantle-derived components.

Origin 

The origin of the seamounts has been explained with either one or two hotspots of Cretaceous age. Dating of the seamounts supports a hotspot origin only for the northwest-southeast trend, however. This hotspot has been named Euterpe hotspot after Euterpe, Greek Muse of musicians. Plate reconstructions for the time period based on the dates of the northwest-southeast trend and the older Line Islands are consistent with each other.

It is possible that their formation was influenced by the nearby presence of a spreading ridge, a process which has been suggested for other hotspots such as Réunion, Iceland, Azores and others as well. The Pacific-Farallon Ridge was located east of the Musicians Seamounts and flow from the hotspot to the ridge may have generated the east-west trending ridges of the Musicians Seamounts.

Alternative explanations for the formation of the Musicians Seamounts is the presence of a former spreading ridge at their site, and crustal weaknesses associated with the so-called "bending line" in the region which was formed by a change in the motion of the Pacific Plate.

Geologic context 

About 10,000 seamounts and islands are estimated to dot the floor of the Pacific Ocean, forming clusters and chains. The origin of chains of seamounts and islands is commonly explained with the hotspot hypothesis, which posits that as the crust migrates above a stationary hotspot volcanism forms these structures. A further hypothesis states that the hotspots, sourced from mantle plumes, are static with respect to each other and thus geologists can reconstruct the history of plate movement by analyzing the tracks traced on the crust by hotspots.

The Pacific Ocean contains a number of seamount and island chains, some of which have been attributed to hotspots such as the Cobb hotspot, Caroline hotspot, Hawaiian hotspot, Marquesas hotspot, Tahiti hotspot, Pitcairn hotspot, Macdonald hotspot and Louisville hotspot. Not all of these hotspots are necessarily fed by a deep continuous mantle plume; some may be nourished by discrete batches of melting material that rise through the mantle. Other chains may be controlled by mantle flow towards a spreading ridge, which has been proposed for the Musicians chain.

Biology 

Deep sea corals and sponges grow on the Musicians Seamounts; corals identified include Antipathes, Acanthogorgia, chrysogorgidae, Hemicorallium, isididae, Paracalyptrophora, Pleurogorgia and primnoids, while sponges include Caulophacus, Hyalostylus, Poliopogon and Saccocalyx. In some places true "coral forests" grow on the seamounts. Animal species observed on the seamounts by remotely operated vehicles include amphipods, anemones, anglerfish, arrow worms, bristlemouths, brittle stars, cephalopods, chirons, codling fish, ctenophores, crinoids, cusk eels, fangtooth fish, halosaurs, jellyfish, larvaceans, piglet squid, polychaetes, ribbon worms, sea cucumbers, sea elephants, sea pens, sea spiders, sea stars, shrimp, siphonophores, spider crabs, squat lobsters, urchins and zoanthids.

Eruptive history 

The Musicians Seamounts were active during the Late Cretaceous. Ages obtained on some seamounts range from 96 million years ago for the Northwest Cluster, over 94 million years ago for Hammerstein, 91 million years ago for Mahler, 90 million years ago for Brahms, 86 million years ago for Rachmaninoff, 84 million years ago for Liszt, 83 million years ago for Khatchaturian and West Schumann, 82 million years ago for West Mendelssohn, 79 million years ago for East Mendelssohn, 75 million years ago for Bach Ridge and Haydn to 65 million years ago for Paumakua.

Based on considerations derived from plate tectonics, earlier volcanism could have occurred on the Farallon Plate, which has been subducted in its entirely and its volcanoes have now vanished. No volcanism in the Musicians Seamounts post-dating about 70 million years ago was discovered at first; either volcanism ceased at that time or it continued on the Farallon Plate again. The Euterpe hotspot is now extinct, although an unusually shallow ocean region around  may be a remnant of the Euterpe hotspot.

Some of the ridges in the Musicians Seamounts have much younger ages, 53 to 52 million years ago by argon-argon dating and continuing to 48 to 47 million years ago. This volcanism occurred at the time of major changes in the motion of the Pacific Plate; stresses occurring within the plate may have reactivated the Musicians volcanoes and resulted in this late stage activity. One earthquake has been recorded in the province during historical time.

See also 

 Geologists Seamounts

Notes

References

Sources

External links 
 
 NOAA Images Collection

Volcanoes of the Pacific Ocean
Submarine volcanoes
Seamounts of the Pacific Ocean
Cretaceous volcanism
Eocene volcanism